Splettstoesser Pass is a snow-covered pass at about 2,200 m, running east–west through Findlay Range to the northwest of Gadsden Peaks, in the Admiralty Mountains, Victoria Land. The name was proposed by R.H. Findlay, leader of a New Zealand Antarctic Research Program (NZARP) geological party, 1981–82, which used this pass in travel between Field Neve and Atkinson Glacier, a tributary to Dennistoun Glacier. Named after John F. Splettstoesser, geologist, Minnesota Geological Survey, who was field coordinator for United States Antarctic Research Program (USARP) projects during the International Northern Victoria Land Project, 1981–82.

Mountain passes of Victoria Land
Pennell Coast